Düker is a surname. Notable people with the surname include: 

Bernd Düker (born 1992), German footballer
Heinrich Düker (1898–1986), German psychologist, politician, and academic
Julius Düker (born 1996), German footballer

See also
Ducker

German-language surnames